The Early Years is the second compilation album by Swiss folk metal band Eluveitie. It was released to mark the 10th anniversary of the band and the compilation contains both re-recorded songs from their EP and demo Vên and also all the tracks from their first studio album Spirit.

Track listing

Chart performance

References 

Eluveitie compilation albums
2012 compilation albums